World on Fire is a British war drama television series created by Peter Bowker. Set in the Second World War, the series follows the intertwined lives of ordinary civilians across Europe who are caught up in World War II.

Plot

The series follows the hidden lives of ordinary people from Britain, Poland, France, Germany and the United States during World War II. The drama switches its scenes between various locations in France, Britain, Germany and Poland. It features repeated visits to Paris, Warsaw, Manchester, Berlin and Dunkirk.

Cast

Main
 Jonah Hauer-King as Harry Chase, an interpreter at the British embassy in Warsaw who is later commissioned into the British Army, and joins the SOE.
 Helen Hunt as Nancy Campbell, an American journalist struggling to broadcast the truth from Berlin.
 Sean Bean as Douglas Bennett, a bus conductor, pacifist and shell-shocked veteran of the Battle of the Somme, and father to Lois and Tom.
 Lesley Manville as Robina Chase, Harry's wealthy and emotionally repressed mother.
 Julia Brown as Lois Bennett, a 21-year-old factory worker and talented singer who later joins the Entertainments National Service Association.
 Zofia Wichłacz as Kasia Tomaszeski, a waitress from Warsaw, with whose family Harry lodges, who later joins the Polish Resistance
 Brian J. Smith as Webster O'Connor, a gay American doctor based in Paris and Nancy's nephew.
 Parker Sawyers as Albert Fallou, a Parisian jazz saxophonist and Webster's lover.
 Blake Harrison as Sergeant Stan Raddings, Harry's platoon sergeant.
 Ewan Mitchell as Tom Bennett, Lois's older brother, a petty criminal who later joins the Royal Navy. 
 Mateusz Więcławek as Grzegorz Tomaszeski, Kasia's sickly younger brother who joins the Polish army with his father.
 Eugénie Derouand as Henriette Guilbert, a nurse at Webster's hospital in Paris, secretly Jewish.

Supporting
 Yrsa Daley-Ward as Connie Knight, a close friend, colleague and musical partner of Lois.
 Max Riemelt as Schmidt, Nancy's Nazi censor and minder in Berlin.
 Eryk Biedunkiewicz as Jan Tomaszeski, Kasia's youngest brother, a schoolboy.
 Johannes Zeiler as Uwe Rossler, Claudia's husband who runs a textile firm.
 Victoria Mayer as Claudia Rossler, a German mother living in Berlin, struggling to contain the secret of her daughter's epilepsy.
 Tomasz Ziętek as Tomasz, a colleague of Kasia in the resistance.
 Dora Zyogouri, the epileptic daughter of Victoria and Uwe.
 Ansu Kabia as Eddie Knight, Connie's husband, a jazz trumpeter.
 Borys Szyc as Konrad, a Polish army soldier.
 Matthew Aubrey as Private Taffy Morgan, a member of Harry's platoon.
 Cealleach Spellman as Private Joe Broughton, a member of Harry’s Platoon from Leeds. 
 Arthur Darvill as Wing Commander Vernon Hunter, an RAF fighter pilot.
 Bruno Alexander as Klaus Rossler, Claudia and Uwe's son, a German soldier.
 Helene Grass as Frau Pessler, one of Uwe's employees, a committed Nazi.
 Benjamin Wainwright as Randy O'Connor, an American fighter pilot in Vernon's squadron and Webster’s brother.
 Jack Deam as Ted, manager of Lois and Connie's ENSA unit.
 Agata Kulesza as Maria Tomaszeski, Stefan's wife and mother of Kasia, Grzegorz and Jan.
 Buom Tihngang as Demba, a Senegalese soldier who Harry meets in France.
 Charlie Creed-Miles as David Walker, Harry's superior at the Warsaw embassy.
 Prasanna Puwanarajah as Major Taylor. 
 Matthew Roamin as Geoff, a shellshocked soldier Harry encounters in France. 
 Patrick Kennedy as Campbell.
 Tomasz Kot as Stefan Tomaszeski, a veteran of World War I and father of Kasia, Jan and Grzegorz who rejoins the Polish army.
 Jonathan McGuiness as Sir Oswald Mosley
 Benedict Taylor as Dr Drake, head of a mental hospital in Manchester.

Episodes

Series 1 (2019)

Production
The seven-part series was commissioned by the BBC in October 2017, with Peter Bowker writing. Casting began in October 2018, with Helen Hunt and Lesley Manville amongst the first additions and filming beginning in Prague. Sean Bean was cast in November.
Filming took place in Chester in November 2018, Liverpool in March 2019 and also included other locations such as Prague, Lytham St. Annes, Wigan and Lyme Park.

Series two began filming on 13 July 2022 in Belfast, Northern Ireland, delayed due to the COVID-19 pandemic.Lesley Manville, Jonah Hauer-King, Julia Brown, Zofia Wichlacz, Blake Harrison, Eugénie Derouand, Eryk Biedunkiewicz and Cealleach Spellman were all confirmed to be returning, while Mark Bonnar, Ahad Raza Mir and Gregg Sulkin joined the cast. Yrsa Daley-Ward, Parker Sawyers and Ewan Mitchell were confirmed to be returning by December. Filming wrapped in September, with reshoots occurring the following December.

Ratings

Critical reception 
World on Fire was reviewed positively by Lucy Mangan of The Guardian. The historical accuracy of some elements of the series, however, was criticised by some reviewers, including columnist Peter Hitchens.

References

External links
 
 
 
 

2019 British television series debuts
2010s British drama television series
2020s British drama television series
BBC television dramas
Television series by Mammoth Screen
Television series by ITV Studios
English-language television shows
Television shows set in Lancashire
Television shows set in Paris
Television shows set in Warsaw
Television shows set in Berlin
Television series set in the 1930s
Television series set in the 1940s
Works about the Dunkirk evacuation
World War II television drama series